The 2006 Ibero-American Championships in Athletics (Spanish: XII Campeonato Iberoamericano de Atletismo) was the twelfth edition of the international athletics competition between Ibero-American nations that place at the Francisco Montaner Stadium in Ponce, Puerto Rico between 26–28 May.

It was the first time that Puerto Rico hosted the competition and it won eighteen medals, three of them gold. In the absence of a Cuban delegation, it was Brazil that dominated the championships, taking seventeen golds and 35 medals in total. Spain ranked a distant second with six golds and 23 medals. Colombia won four golds, while Argentina and the Dominican Republic each had three.

Only four championship records were broken at the competition: Germán Chiaraviglio and Fabiana Murer improved the men's and women's pole vault records, with Murer's mark being a South American record clearance. Juana Castillo set a new championship and national mark in the heptathlon, while Maíla Machado bettered the 100 metres hurdles time.

Brazil's Elisângela Adriano was the only athlete of the tournament to win two individual events as she completed a shot put and discus throw double. Other prominent performances were Javier Culson's win for the hosts in the 400 metres hurdles, Hudson de Souza and Jéssica Augusto's title defences over 3000 metres, and Irving Saladino's clearance of 8.42 m to win the long jump.

In spite of there generally being a lower standard of performances than at previous meets, some athletes improved their national records. Amarilys Alméstica won the hammer throw with a Puerto Rican record, while her silver medal-winning teammates in the 4×100 metres relay also beat their national mark on home soil. Lower down the order, Peru's César Barquero improved the 800 m national mark and Gabriela Traña broke the Costa Rican record for the steeplechase.

Medal summary

Men

Women

Medal table

Note: The official medal count from the 2010 RFEA report incorrectly states that Chile won four silvers and six bronze medals. Furthermore, it does not list Heber Viera's 200 m silver medal in Uruguay's tally.

Participation
Of the twenty-nine member nations of the Asociación Iberoamericana de Atletismo twenty-three sent delegations to the 2006 championships. Andorra, admitted into the organisation in 2005, competed for the first time. All the African nations, except for Angola, were absent, as was the region leader Cuba. A total of 313 athletes took part at the event.

 (3)
 (7)
 (16)
 (2)
 (48)
 (13)
 (23)
 (2)
 (38)
 (1)
 (8)
 (3)
 (19)
 (1)
 (2)
 (1)
 (1)
 (8)
 (63)
 (3)
 (35)
 (4)
 (12)

References

Results
Meet Results. Athlecac. Retrieved on 2012-01-09.
El Atletismo Ibero-Americano - San Fernando 2010 (pgs. 193-201). RFEA. Retrieved on 2012-01-09.

Ibero-American Championships in Athletics
Ibero-American
Ibero-American
International athletics competitions hosted by Puerto Rico
May 2006 sports events in North America